Kara-Tash may refer to the following places in Kyrgyzstan:

Kara-Tash, Kara-Kulja, a village in Kara-Kulja District, Osh Region
Kara-Tash, Nookat, a village in Nookat District, Osh Region